Statement or statements may refer to:

Common uses
Statement (computer science), the smallest standalone element of an imperative programming language
Statement (logic), declarative sentence that is either true or false
Statement, a declarative phrase in language (linguistics)
Statement, a North American paper size of 5 1⁄2 in × 8 in (140 mm × 203 mm), also known under various names such as half letter and memo
Financial statement, formal summary of the financial activities of a business, person, or other entity
Mathematical statement, a statement in logic and mathematics
Political statement, any act or nonverbal form of communication that is intended to influence a decision to be made for or by a group
Press statement, written or recorded communication directed at members of the news media
Statement of Special Educational Needs, outlining specific provision needed for a child in England
Witness statement (law), a signed document recording the evidence given by a person with testimony relevant to an incident
A written ministerial statement to Parliament in the United Kingdom

Music
Statements (album), a 1962 album by the jazz vibraphonist Milt Jackson
"Statement" (song), a 2008 song by the band Boris
"Statements" (song), a 2017 song by Loreen

See also
The Statement (disambiguation)
Sentence (linguistics), words grouped meaningfully to express a statement, question, exclamation, request, command or suggestion
State (disambiguation)
Theme (music), a statement in music

sn:Zvakadudzwa